Stanisław Pestka (8 April 1929 – 2 April 2015) was a Kashubian poet. He was born in Rolbik. Pestke was also a translator of Russian texts into Kashubian language. He was the chairman of Kashubian-Pomeranian Association from 1976 to 1980 and again from 1992 to 1994. He was a Kashubian activist. He died in 2015.

Publications 
He published poetry under the pen name Jan Zbrzyca,  and his articles and feuilletons  were signed Krëban z Milachòwa. (The word krëban or kùrban literally to a jar for storing animal fat, but "Krëbans" also refer to an Ethnic subgroup of Kashubians.)

Południca, Gdańsk 1976
Wizrë ë duchë, Gdańsk 1986; 
 Wieczòrny widnik, 2002
W krainie chmurników, 2011, collection of prose

References

Bibliography
 J. Drzeżdżon, "Współczesna literatura kaszubska 1945-1980", Warszawa 1986
 Polish bibliography
 "Z zaborskiego matecznika. O Stanisławie Pestce - Janie Zbrzycy", pod red. J. Borzyszkowskiego, Gdańsk 2008.

1929 births
2015 deaths
People from Brusy
Kashubian poets
Kashubian translators
Polish language activists
20th-century Polish poets
20th-century translators